This is a list of cathedrals in the state of New York, United States:

See also
List of cathedrals in the United States

References